Alimata Koné (born 22 January 1965) is an Ivorian sprinter. She competed in the women's 400 metres at the 1992 Summer Olympics.

References

External links
 

1965 births
Living people
Athletes (track and field) at the 1992 Summer Olympics
Ivorian female sprinters
Olympic athletes of Ivory Coast
Place of birth missing (living people)
Olympic female sprinters